The women's flyweight is a competition featured at the 2019 World Taekwondo Championships, and was held at the Manchester Arena in Manchester, United Kingdom on 17 and 18 May. Flyweights were limited to a maximum of 49 kilograms in body mass.

Medalists

Results
Legend
W — Won by withdrawal

Finals

Top half

Section 1

Section 2

Bottom half

Section 3

Section 4

References
Draw
Results

External links
Official website

Women's 49
World